Ronald Alfred St Clair Brewer (8 April 1921 – 16 June 2003) was an Australian politician. He was the Country Party (later the National Party) member for Goulburn in the New South Wales Legislative Assembly from 1965 to 1984.

Born in Watsons Bay to farmer Alfred George Brewer and Doris Griffin, he was educated at Gunning, Goulburn and Naremburn, leaving school at the age of 14. He became a rural worker before enlisting in the armed forces in 1938, serving in the 7th Light Horse Regiment of the 2nd Light Horse Brigade until 1940, when he joined the RAAF. He was discharged as medically unfit in 1942, and joined the 2nd AIF, being stationed in New Guinea as a warrant officer. He was discharged from the armed forces in 1946.

Brewer married Dorothy Sorrell on 16 November 1946, with whom he would have six children. As an ex-serviceman he was settled with the Green Hills property near Marulan in 1948, and he became captain of the local Bush Fire Brigade. In 1959 he was elected to Mulwaree Shire Council, becoming president in 1962; he served until 1965.

In 1965, Brewer was elected to the New South Wales Legislative Assembly as the Country Party member for Goulburn, gaining the Labor-held seat after a three-cornered contest with both Labor and the Liberal Party. He held the seat easily until 1974, when he resigned to contest the federal seat of Eden-Monaro. Narrowly defeated by sitting Labor MP Jim Snow, Brewer contested the by-election for his old state seat and was re-elected. Redistributions weakened his margin in subsequent years, and he retired in 1984.

Brewer died in Goulburn in 2003.

References

 

1921 births
2003 deaths
National Party of Australia members of the Parliament of New South Wales
Members of the New South Wales Legislative Assembly
20th-century Australian politicians
Australian Army soldiers
Royal Australian Air Force personnel of World War II
Royal Australian Air Force airmen
Australian Army personnel of World War II